60th & Sheridan–Arvada Gold Strike station (sometimes stylized as 60th & Sheridan•Arvada Gold Strike) is a commuter rail station on the G Line of the Denver RTD system in Denver, Colorado. It is located in Arvada, Colorado and is the fourth northbound station from Denver Union Station. It opened on April 26, 2019.

The public art chosen for the station is "Gold Pour" by Aaron T. Stephan and commemorates the first documented gold strike in Colorado at the nearby confluence of Ralston and Clear Creeks. The artwork features shimmering gold made of glass and mosaic tiles that appear to pour over the station's wall.

References 

RTD commuter rail stations
Railway stations in the United States opened in 2019
Arvada, Colorado
2019 establishments in Colorado